NS102 is a kainate receptor antagonist.

References

Nitro compounds
Kainate receptor antagonists